Miroslav Koranda (6 November 1934 – 6 October 2008) was a Czech coxswain who competed for Czechoslovakia in the 1952 and 1956 Summer Olympics.

He was born in Prague. In 1952 he coxed the Czechoslovak boat that won the gold medal in the coxed four event. Four years later he coxed the Czechoslovak boat that was eliminated in the semi-final of the eight competition.

References

1934 births
2008 deaths
Czech male rowers
Czechoslovak male rowers
Coxswains (rowing)
Olympic rowers of Czechoslovakia
Rowers at the 1952 Summer Olympics
Rowers at the 1956 Summer Olympics
Olympic gold medalists for Czechoslovakia
Olympic medalists in rowing
Medalists at the 1952 Summer Olympics
European Rowing Championships medalists
Rowers from Prague